Saint George's Day is the feast day of Saint George, celebrated by Christian churches, countries, and cities of which he is the patron saint, including Bulgaria, England, Georgia, Portugal, Romania, Cáceres, Alcoy, Aragon and Catalonia.

Saint George's Day is celebrated on 23 April, the traditionally accepted date of the saint's death in the Diocletianic Persecution.

Date
In the calendars of the Lutheran Churches, those of the Anglican Communion, and the General Calendar of the Roman Rite, the feast of Saint George is normally celebrated on 23 April. Since Easter often falls close to Saint George's Day, the church celebration of the feast may be moved from 23 April: for 2011, 2014,  2019 and 2022 the Lutheran, Anglican and Catholic calendars celebrated Saint George's Day on the first available weekday after the Octave of Easter (see Easter Week) (2 May 2011, 28 April 2014, 29 April 2019 and 25 April 2022 respectively). 

The church celebration of nearly all saints' days are transferred if they fall on a Sunday (because Sunday is the celebration of Christ's Resurrection, which is far more important than a saint's commemoration). 

In fact, despite the rule above, the Roman Catholic Church in England and Wales celebrated St George's Day on Tuesday 26 April 2022, with the feast day of St Mark taking precedence and being celebrated on Monday 25 April. The Church of England's Common Worship Lectionary for 2022 had the same dates, with St George's Day being celebrated on Tuesday 26 April, according to the image of the physical book shown on social media.

Similarly, the Eastern Orthodox celebration of the feast moves accordingly to the first Monday after Easter or, as it is sometimes called, to the Monday of Bright Week.  
Besides the 23 April feast, some Orthodox Churches have additional feasts dedicated to St George. The country of Georgia  celebrates the feast of St George on 23 April and, more prominently, 10 November (Julian calendar), which until the year 2100 fall on 6 May and 23 November (Gregorian calendar), respectively. The Russian Orthodox Church celebrates the dedication of the Church of St George in Kiev by Yaroslav the Wise in 1051 on 26 November (Julian calendar), which until the year 2100 falls on 9 December on the Gregorian calendar.

In the Tridentine Calendar Saint George's Day was given the rank of "Semidouble". In Pope Pius XII's 1955 calendar this rank is reduced to "Simple". In Pope John XXIII's 1960 calendar the celebration is just a "Commemoration". In Pope Paul VI's revision of the calendar that came into force in 1969, it was given the equivalent rank of a "Memorial", of optional use. In some countries, such as England, the rank is higher.

Western tradition

English Catholic and Anglican tradition

The earliest documented mention of St. George in England comes from the Catholic monk the venerable Bede (c. 673–735).  His feast day is also mentioned in the Durham Collectar, a ninth-century liturgical work. The will of Alfred the Great is said to refer to the saint, in a reference to the church of Fordington, Dorset. At Fordington a stone over the south door records the miraculous appearance of St. George to lead crusaders into battle. Early (c. 10th century) dedications of churches to St. George are noted in England, for example at Fordingham, Dorset, at Thetford, Southwark and Doncaster. In the past, historians mistakenly pointed to the Synod of Oxford in 1222 as elevating the feast to special prominence, but the earliest manuscripts of the synod's declaration do not mention the feast of St. George. The declarations of the Province of Canterbury in 1415 and the Province of York in 1421 elevated the feast to a double major, and as a result, work was prohibited and church attendance was mandatory.  Edward III (1327–1377) put his Order of the Garter (founded c. 1348) under the banner of St. George. This order is still the foremost order of knighthood in England and St. George's Chapel at Windsor Castle was built by Edward IV and Henry VII in honour of the order. The badge of the Order shows Saint George on horseback slaying the dragon. Froissart observed the English invoking St. George as a battle cry on several occasions during the Hundred Years' War (1337–1453). Certain English soldiers also displayed the pennon of St. George.

St. George's Day was a major feast and national holiday in England on a par with Christmas from the early 15th century. The tradition of celebration St. George's day had waned by the end of the 18th century after the union of England and Scotland. Nevertheless, the link with St. George continues today, for example Salisbury holds an annual St. George's Day pageant, the origins of which are believed to go back to the 13th century. In recent years the popularity of St. George's Day appears to be increasing gradually. BBC Radio 3 had a full programme of St. George's Day events in 2006, and Andrew Rosindell, Conservative MP for Romford, has been putting the argument forward in the House of Commons to make St. George's Day a public holiday. In early 2009, Mayor of London Boris Johnson spearheaded a campaign to encourage the celebration of St. George's Day, and during the 2017 and 2019 General Elections the Labour Party campaigned for it to be a public holiday. Today, St. George's day may be celebrated with anything English including morris dancing and Punch and Judy shows.

A traditional custom on St. George's day is fly or adorn the St. George's Cross flag in some way: pubs in particular can be seen on 23 April festooned with garlands of St. George's crosses.
It is customary for the hymn "Jerusalem" to be sung in cathedrals, churches and chapels on St. George's Day, or on the Sunday closest to it.

There is a growing reaction to the recent indifference to St. George's Day. Organisations such as English Heritage and the Royal Society of St. George have been encouraging celebrations. There have also been calls to replace St. George as patron saint of England on the grounds that he was an obscure figure who had no direct connection with the country. However, there is no obvious consensus as to whom to replace him with, though names suggested include Edmund the Martyr, Cuthbert of Lindisfarne, or Saint Alban, with the last having topped a BBC Radio 4 poll on the subject.
Recently there have been calls to reinstate St. Edmund as the patron Saint of England as he was displaced by George some 400 years ago.

Religious observance of St. George's day changes when it is too close to Easter. According to the Church of England's calendar, when St. George's Day falls between Palm Sunday and the Second Sunday of Easter inclusive, it is moved to the Monday after the Second Sunday of Easter. In 2011, for example, 23 April was Holy Saturday, so St. George's Day was moved to Monday 2 May. The Catholic Church in England and Wales has a similar practice.

Saint George is the patron saint of The Scout Movement, which has held St. George's Day parades since its first years.  St. George is the patron saint of many other organisations. In the United States, the National Catholic Committee on Scouting uses the saint for many of their awards and activities.

In sport, 23 April is also the anniversary of the St. George Dragons Rugby League Football Club. The St. George club coincidentally played their inaugural New South Wales Rugby League first grade match on St. George's Day, 23 April 1921 at the Sydney Sports Ground in Australia.

In Newfoundland and Labrador, St. George's Day is a provincial holiday, usually observed on the Monday nearest 23 April.

Iberian peninsula

Spain 

Saint George became the patron saint of the former Crown of Aragon, when King Peter I of Aragon won the Battle of Alcoraz in 1096 commending his army and people to the auspices of the saint. He is also patron of several former territories under the Crown of Aragon, including Valencia, Catalonia, Sicily, Sardinia, and several regions of Italy. In most cases, the reason for those cities' adoption of the saint as their holy patron and shared flag is linked to the Aragonese colonial influence and various battles that occurred throughout the Mediterranean during the Reconquista. The international expansion of the Reconquista that followed over the next two centuries across the Mediterranean also led to the adoption of the cross of Saint George as a coat of arms by Christian Crusaders.

The Feast of Saint George is celebrated enthusiastically in the Region and former Kingdom of Aragon, and is a regional feast day. On 23 April, Aragon celebrates its "Día de Aragón" (Day of Aragon) in commemoration of the Battle of Alcoraz (Baralla d'Alcoraz in Aragonese), where the city of Huesca was reconquered by the Aragonese army and in which tradition says that St. George appeared at a critical moment for the Christian Army.

In Catalonia, la Diada de Sant Jordi involves traditions similar to those of Saint Valentine's Day in Anglophone countries. Traditionally, boys give girls a red rose and girls give boys a book. Among roses, many piles of books are for sale in Catalan streets; 1.5m books were sold in 2015.

In the Valencian city of Alcoi, Saint George's Day is commemorated as a thanksgiving celebration for the purported aid the saint provided to the Christian troops fighting the Muslims in the siege of the city. Its citizens commemorate the day with a festivity in which thousands of people parade in medieval costumes, forming two "armies" of Moors and Christians and re-enacting the siege that gave the city to the Christians.

In Cáceres, in the western region of Extremadura, the capital city of Cáceres celebrates the reconquest of the city from Muslim rule on 23 April 1229 by King Alfonso IX of León, with commemorative celebrations which begin on the eve of the feast day with a parade of Moors and Christians and various effigies of Saint George and the Dragon on horseback. Once the parade reaches the main square, they reenact a battle between both camps culminating with the burning of a winning Dragon effigy (as selected and voted by the people of the city).

The town Viérnoles in Cantabria celebrates several days of "Las Fiestas de San Jorge" at the end of April and/or the beginning of May.

Portugal 
Devotions to Saint George in Portugal date back to the twelfth century, and Saint Constable attributed the victory of the Portuguese against what is now mostly modern day Spain, in the battle of Aljubarrota in the fourteenth century to Saint George.  During the reign of King John I (1357–1433) Saint George became the patron saint of Portugal and the King ordered that the saint's image on the horse be carried in the Feast of Corpus Christi procession. In fact, the Portuguese Army motto means Portugal and Saint George, in perils and in efforts of war.

Germany Georgiritt

In tradition-rich Buttenheim and many other towns in Bavaria, Georgiritt (plural Georgiritte; "George's Ride") takes place around St. George's Day 23. April, especially around churches dedicated to the saint. Brightly decorated horses and wagons parade several times around the church, in which a service is then held at which the riders and horses are blessed. Various competitions may be held afterwards.

24 April
Exceptionally in the Czech Republic, Hungary and Slovakia, Saint George's Day comes on 24 April. The reason why it was moved from 23 April in case of the Czech's svátek sv. Jiří is, that there is a day of St. Adalbert of Prague (in Czech Svatý Vojtěch), Czech national patron saint, who was martyred on 23 April 997. It is celebrated in a special way.

In Hungary, 24 April is the day of Saint George the Dragonslayer, thus it is the name day of men named György. It is also the Day of the Police, who honour him as a patron saint.

Eastern Orthodox tradition

Under the state atheism of former Eastern Bloc countries, the celebration of Saint George's Day was historically suppressed.

If St. George's Day (or any saint's day) falls during Holy Week or on Easter Day, it is observed on Easter Monday.

Eastern Slavic tradition

The Russian Orthodox Church, which uses the Julian calendar, has two important feasts of Saint George. Besides the feast of 23 April (Julian calendar), common through all Christendom, Russians also celebrate the anniversary of the dedication of the Church of St. George in Kiev by Yaroslav the Wise (1051) on 26 November (Julian Calendar), which currently falls on 9 December. One of the Russian forms of the name George being Yuri, the two feasts are popularly known as Vesenniy Yuriev Den (Yuri's Day in the Spring) and Osenniy Yuriev Den (Yuri's Day in the Fall).

South Slavic tradition and Balkan spring festival

In Serbian, St. George's Day is called Đurđevdan (Cyrillic: Ђурђевдан) and is celebrated on 6 May every year, as the Serbian Orthodox Church uses the Julian, Old Style calendar. St. George's Day is one of the most common Slavas (family patron day) among the Serbs. Đurđevdan is also celebrated by both Orthodox and Muslim Romani and Muslim Gorani. Đurđevdan is celebrated, especially, in the areas of Raška in Serbia. Apart from being the Slava of many families, St. George's Day is marked by morning picnics, music, and folk dances.

Possibly the most celebrated name day in Bulgaria, St. George's Day (Гергьовден, Gergyovden) is a public holiday that takes place on 6 May each year. A common ritual is to prepare and eat a whole lamb, which is an ancient practice possibly related to Slavic pagan sacrificial traditions and the fact that St. George is the patron saint of shepherds. It is also believed to be a magical day when all evil spells can be broken. It was believed that the saint helps the crops to grow and blesses the morning dew, so early in the morning they walked in the pastures and meadows and collected dew, washed their face, hands and feet in it for good luck and even in some rural parts of Bulgaria it was a custom to roll in it naked.

St. George's Day is also Bulgarian Armed Forces Day, made official with a decree of Prince Alexander of Battenberg on 9 January 1880. Parades are organised in the capital Sofia to present the best of the equipment and manpower of the Bulgarian military, as well as in major cities nationwide.

St. George's Day is also called Đurđevdan and is celebrated by Bosnian Serbs and Romani (both Orthodox and Muslim), but also has been celebrated by the other ethnic groups in Bosnia and Herzegovina. Đurđevdan's widespread appeal can be seen in the folk song Đurđevdan popularised by Bijelo Dugme as well as Meša Selimović's novel Death and the Dervish.

In the Greek Orthodox Church, Saint George's Day is celebrated on 23 April, unless this date falls during Lent or Holy Week when it is celebrated on the day following Easter.  Other, lesser saints are commemorated during Lent or Holy Week on their usual dates.  However, because of St. George's standing as one of the church's most venerated megalomartyrs the celebration date is moved outside of Lent and Holy Week so that people can fully celebrate the day.

In the Georgian Church, St. George the Victory-Bearer is commemorated twice a year: on 23 November (the Breaking on the Wheel of Holy Greatmartyr George) and 6 May (the Beheading of St. George). The celebrations likely began in the 4th to 5th centuries. In Georgia, the feast day on 23 November is credited to Saint Nino of Cappadocia, who in Georgian hagiography is a relative of St. George, and is primarily credited with bringing Christianity to the Georgians in the fourth century.

The Romanian Orthodox Church, which uses the Revised Julian calendar, celebrates St. George's Day on 23 April.

Middle East

Veneration of St. George as a martyr originates in the Levant, spread from Palestine through Lebanon to the rest of the Byzantine Empire – though the martyr is not mentioned in the Syriac Breviarium. A titular church built in Lydda during the reign of Constantine the Great (reigned 306–37) was consecrated to "a man of the highest distinction"; the identity of this man with St. George was asserted by the 7th century. The church was destroyed by Muslims in 1010, but was later rebuilt and dedicated to Saint George by the Crusaders. In 1191 and during the conflict known as the Third Crusade (1189–92), the church was again destroyed by the forces of Saladin, Sultan of the Ayyubid dynasty (reigned 1171–93). A new church was erected in 1872 and is still standing.

Christians in the Middle East continue to celebrate St. George's Day, and the custom has been adopted in Muslim tradition via identification of the saint with the figure of Al-Khidr and an association in folk belief with medicine and healing.
In Palestinian culture, the feast is held on 5 May. The feast is held in the Palestinian town of al-Khader, just south of Bethlehem.
Historically, the feast attracted Arabs from throughout Palestine to visit the Monastery of Saint George. On the morning of 6 May, Palestinian Christians from Beit Jala, Bethlehem, Beit Sahour and other parts of Palestine would march in a procession to the monastery.

In Mosul, northern Iraq, St. George's Monastery was destroyed in November 2014 by ISIS militants.

Saint George's Day (Jeries)  is celebrated widely in Jordan, especially in a town near Amman called Fuheis. In Jordan, many churches are dedicated to St. George.

St. George's Day is celebrated throughout Iraq and Lebanon, but especially in towns and villages where churches for St. George have been erected.

Many Christian denominations in Syria celebrate St. George's Day, especially in the Homs Governorate. Following this, participants traditionally dine and dance. The monastery of Mar Jurjus (St. George) dates back to the 6th century and is a regional centre of Orthodox Christianity.

In literature
In the 1897 book Dracula by Bram Stoker, evil things are said to occur on St. George's Eve, beginning at midnight. The date of St. George's Day presented in the book, 5 May (on the Western Gregorian calendar), is St. George's Day as observed by the Eastern Orthodox churches of that era. The belief is that moroi (living vampires), witches, and other dark creatures must gather all the evil power they can between midnight and the dawn of the saint's holy day, so it is unsafe to go outside on that night.

(Excerpt from Dracula, 1897) "Do you know what day it is?" I answered that it was the fourth of May. She shook her head as she said again: "Oh, yes! I know that, I know that! but do you know what day it is?" On my saying that I did not understand, she went on: "It is the eve of St. George's Day. Do you not know that tonight, when the clock strikes midnight, all the evil things in the world will have full sway?

The 1961 play Andorra by Max Frisch focusses greatly on the (fictionalised) Andorran celebrations of St. George's Day. The play begins and ends with references to a ceremonial whitewashing of houses by the town's virgins, again reflecting the day's central theme of purity.

The 2009 play Jerusalem by Jez Butterworth takes place on St. George's Day, 23 April, also the day of death and estimated birth day of William Shakespeare.

Lee Sheridan's debut novella St George's Day, set in Maynooth on 23 April, 2020, examines the day in the life of a part-time supermarket worker. The protagonist, a lazy Theology student, begins noticing parallels between his life and the life of St George. As the blurb reads, he must balance "mundane work with meditation, imagination, and a mouthy manager [the Dragon]."

References

External links

Albanian traditions
April observances
 
National days
Public holidays in Bulgaria
British flag flying days